L.A. Comic Con is a three-day multi-genre convention held annually in downtown Los Angeles, California. L.A. Comic Con is one of the largest independent conventions in the United States and encompasses several categories, including comic, horror, sci-fi, anime, gaming, and pop culture, with a particular focus on the local Los Angeles community.

The convention was founded as Comikaze Expo in 2011 by Regina Carpinelli and her two younger brothers, fans of geek culture from Temecula, California. The convention went through several rebrandings – first to "Stan Lee's Comikaze Expo" and then "Stan Lee's LA Comic Con". L.A. Comic Con is also known as "LACC" and is often described as "A convention created by fans, for fans."

Originally founded as an event to showcase local Los Angeles talent, the first Comikaze Expo in 2011 primarily featured local artists, comic book publishers and dealers, and various celebrity appearances including horror icon Elvira. The convention has grown since then to include a wider variety of entertainment and popular cultures including fantasy, horror, comic books, manga, western animation, toys, and video games. The Con has grown in size every year, starting with 35,000 attendees in 2011 and expanding to over 123,000 attendees in 2019. The convention has drawn big names to match its big crowds, with celebrities like Elijah Wood, Ron Perlman, Gabriel Iglesias, Dwayne "The Rock" Johnson, and Gerard Way attending in years' past.

History
Regina Carpinelli and her two younger brothers, fans of geek culture from Temecula, California, were regular attendees of San Diego Comic-Con International. After moving to Los Angeles, Regina Carpinelli decided that the city needed a large-scale comic book convention. The three Carinellis set up Comikaze Entertainment Inc. and started out to organize one.

The first event, called Comikaze Expo, was held on November 5–6, 2011 in the Kentia Hall of the Los Angeles Convention Center. The large exhibitor space featured local artists, tattoo artists, comic book dealers, comic book publishers, press vendors, designers and collectibles merchants. There was an Artists' Alley where celebrities and artists signed autographs and sold portraits. Traditional contests and gaming tournaments included the Cosplay Contest, the Masquerade, Magic The Gathering, Yu-Gi-Oh, Warhammer, and several original Nintendo games. There were also panels featuring various celebrities, reunions, and upcoming feature films. Among the events was horror icon Elvira's last convention appearance. There were about 35,000 attendees throughout the weekend.

In 2012, veteran creator Stan Lee and his company, POW! Entertainment, as well as Cassandra Peterson (better known as Elvira), formed a partnership with Comikaze Expo, and the convention was rebranded as Stan Lee's Comikaze. That same year, Advanstar joined Stan Lee's Comikaze Expo as a strategic partner, taking on the event's "back end" work managing deals with unions, the convention center, and other "business" aspects of the show.

The 2012 show was held in the South Hall of the Los Angeles Convention Center, and featured about 600 artists and vendors, including gaming publisher Activision, who launched several new games. New activities included a 75,000 sg ft Zombie Apocalypse obstacle course, a Quidditch pitch, and a NERF dart battle hosted by Max Landis. Panel discussions were displayed on a 14 ft jumbotron, including Kevin Smith, a live version of Fatman on Batman with Adam West, a version of the Dating Game with Adrianne Curry, and a Q&A with Stan Lee and Todd McFarlane. That year the show had about 50,000 attendees.

In September 2013, a reality show, Fangasm, premiered on SyFy. The show followed the experiences of seven pop culture fans as they lived together in a Los Angeles apartment building and interned at Stan Lee's Comikaze Expo, vying for his attention and approval. The show was hosted by Regina Carpinelli.

In 2014 the show introduced Club Nokia, a free Cosplay Dance party for its attendees.

For the 2016's edition, the convention was renamed Stan Lee's L.A. Comic Con. The show continued to include panel discussions on a variety of topics, and an all-night dance party.

L.A. Comic Con 2018 was dubbed LACC's "Octoversary", as the eighth show in the convention's history. The show featured a celebration of Fangoria, a horror film magazine. Elijah Wood appeared at the con to promote SpectreVision's film "Mandy", and attendees also got a private screening of "Mandy". Tenacious D appeared on a main stage panel for a Q&A about Post-Apocalypto. The cast of Marvel's "Agents of Shield" also held a main stage panel, as did Marvel's Runaways.

In 2019, L.A. Comic Con continued expanding its show floor by adding more programming and event categories, leading the show to be described as "one of the most diverse celebrations of pop culture in Los Angeles."

The 2019 con saw the addition of a full "Horror" section to the con and over 800 exhibitors. New exhibits included a Jay and Silent Bob Reboot photo op with Kevin Smith and Jason Mewes in front of the 30 ft Quick Stop Facade an exhibition of famous automobiles from the Petersen Automotive Museum and a live wrestling event with Women of Wrestling. LG Display had an activation on the exhibit floor with an OLED TV Truck on the convention floor. On Friday October 11, the first night of L.A. Comic Con, KROQ's Stryker and Klein broadcast live from the LACC VIP Lounge for 4 hours.

Programming
L.A. Comic Con is often described as a convention "by fans, for fans," largely because of its reputation for being communicative with their attendees and incorporating fan requests into the convention's programming. LA Comic Con 2019 made several major programming decisions based on convention attendees' responses to an email survey, including adding a horror section to the convention and bringing in the casts of The Office and Spongebob Squarepants.

In addition to their focus on fan-friendly programming, L.A. Comic Con also prides itself as being a family-friendly event. The convention is open for free to children 12 and under with an adult who has a 1-Day or 3-Day badge. The convention also has an annual tradition of hosting an Indoor Trick-Or-Treat event on Sundays for children 12 and under for The Indoor Trick-Or-Treat event traditionally goes on for two hours' on the 3rd and final day of the con. Children can trick-or-treat at any of the convention's booths or tables.

L.A. Comic Con 2019 included programming driven by major feature films, including a main stage panel for the feature film "Zombieland: Double Tap" with the cast and director of the film and an early pre-release screening for convention attendees.

L.A. Comic Con 2019 had several high profile main stage panels. There were several cast reunions, including a "Hellboy" reunion with Ron Perlman and Doug Jones, a reunion panel with the case of "The Office" and a reunion of the cast of "X-Men: The Animated Series".

Other 2019 programming included a panel interview with the Incredible Hulk's Lou Ferrigno and Flash Gordon's Sam Jones, The Ultimate Spider-Man's Drake Bell a main-stage panel with the cast of Steven Universe and the cast of the film Daniel Isn't Real.

L.A. Comic Con also hosts the Annual National Cosplay Championship. The inaugural cosplay competition took place in 2015 The National Cosplay Championship has reoccurred at L.A. Comic Con every year, with the fifth Annual Cosplay National Championship at the 2019 L.A. Comic Con being officially presented by Disney's "Maleficent: Mistress of Evil".

Exclusive collectibles
L.A. Comic Con annually boasts collectible items that are exclusively available at a given year's convention. In 2019, L.A. Comic Con's exclusive collectibles included Funko Pops from Hot Topic.

Hot Topic has been a major partner of L.A. Comic Con since 2017, having sponsored and provided exclusive merchandise for the con in 2017, 2018, and 2019.

Convention leadership and organization
Chris DeMoulin is L.A. Comic Con's current CEO, having worked with the convention since its second year in 2012. Growing up as a fan of comics since he was a young child, Chris DeMoulin amassed a large collection of comic books before he had to sell them as a young adult to pay for his college education. Mr. DeMoulin's genuine passion for the comic book community led him to build L.A. Comic Con as a fan-driven, community-oriented convention.

The convention maintains a full-time team of just under 10 employees throughout the year, and seasonally expands annually to employ 150 staff during the convention's official event weekend.

Stan Lee's legacy at the Con
Formerly known as "Stan Lee's L.A. Comic Con", Stan Lee formed a partnership with the convention in 2012 and continued working with the event until his passing in 2018. Mr. Lee was motivated to work with L.A. Comic Con based on their fan-motivated organizational culture. "I think he felt the legacy of what we wanted to create here was safe in our hands, because we were honest-to-goodness fans, not just business people looking to make a buck." - Chris DeMoulin, CEO of Comikaze Entertainment

L.A. Comic Con 2019 featured numerous dedications to Stan Lee's legacy, including a memorial wall inviting attendees to write their well-wishes in Stan Lee's memory and a main stage panel hosted by Deadpool co-creator Rob Liefeld in Mr. Lee's honor.

Events

References

External links
 
 http://articles.latimes.com/2011/nov/03/entertainment/la-et-pickcomic3-20111103
 http://geekout.blogs.cnn.com/2012/04/11/stan-lee-launches-his-own-comic-convention/

Comics conventions in the United States
Conventions in Los Angeles
Annual events in Los Angeles County, California
Multigenre conventions
Recurring events established in 2011
Events in Los Angeles
Stan Lee